This is a list of notable German scientists.

 Alois Alzheimer
 Franz Aepinus
 Ralf Altmeyer
 Hermann Anschütz-Kaempfe
 Ludwig Aschoff
 Richard Baerwald
 Adolf von Baeyer
 Emil von Behring
 Martin Beneke
 Roland Benz
 Friedrich Bergius
 Ernest Beutler
 Peter Beyer
 Heinrich Ernst Beyrich
 Wilhelm von Bezold
 William Blandowski
 Paul Richard Heinrich Blasius
 Jens Blauert
 Max Bodenstein
 Harald von Boehmer
 Armin von Bogdandy
 Friedrich Boie
 Max Born
 Carl Bosch
 Johann Friedrich von Brandt
 Magnus von Braun
 Wernher von Braun
 Ernst Wilhelm von Brücke
 Franz Ernst Bruckmann
 Ernst Büchner
 Robert Bunsen
 Friedrich Burmeister
 Abraham Buschke
 Adolf Butenandt
 Karin Büttner-Janz
 Jean Cabanis
 Sethus Calvisius
 Franz Ludwig von Cancrin
 Georg Cantor
 Joseph Carlebach
 Ernst Boris Chain
 Otto Detlev Creutzfeldt
 Rudolf Criegee
 Theodor Curtius
 Daniel Dahm
 Max Delbrück
 Otto Diels
 Gerhard Domagk
 Nikolai Eberhardt
 Christian Gottfried Ehrenberg
 Paul Ehrlich
 Manfred Eigen
 Albert Einstein
 Bernhard Eitel
 Paul Erman
 Johann Christian Polycarp Erxleben
 Adam Karl August von Eschenmayer
 Andreas von Ettingshausen
 Leonhard Euler
 Daniel Gabriel Fahrenheit
 Horst Feistel
 Peter Finke
 Hermann Emil Fischer
 Naika Foroutan
 Werner Forssmann
 Salomon Franck
 Joseph Fraunhofer
 Reinhard Furrer
 Carl Friedrich Gauss
 Johannes Gehrke
 Hanns Bruno Geinitz
 Christian Ludwig Gersten
 Friederich Golz
 Albrecht von Graefe
 Arnold Graffi
 Peter Griess
 Fritz Haber
 Heinz Haber
 Otto Hahn
 Willy Hartner
 Hartmut Heinrich
 Reinhart Heinrich
 Wilhelm Heinrich Heintz
 Jochen Heisenberg
 Martin Heisenberg
 Werner Heisenberg
 Heinrich Hertz
 József Károly Hell
 Maximilian Hell
 Gustav Hellmann
 Hermann von Helmholtz
 Friedrich Gustav Jakob Henle
 Johann Friedrich Wilhelm Herbst
 Gustav Herglotz
 Grete Hermann
 Richard Hesse
 Johann F. C. Hessel
 Franz Hillenkamp
 Diederich Hinrichsen
 Fritz Hofmann
 Robert Hübner
 Alexander von Humboldt
 Klaus Hurrelmann
 Engelbert Kaempfer
 Elisabeth Kalko
 Franz Josef Kallmann
 Immanuel Kant
 Michael Karas
 Friedrich August Kekulé von Stradonitz
 Oskar Kellner
 Wolfgang von Kempelen
 Johannes Kepler
 Franz Kessler
 Uwe Kils
 Athanasius Kircher
 Gustav Kirchhoff
 Siegfried Knemeyer
 Robert Koch
 August Köhler
 Georges J. F. Köhler
 Heinz Kohnen
 Joseph Gottlieb Kölreuter
 Ralph von Königswald
 Wladimir Köppen
 Wilhelm Körner
 Ulrich Kortz
 Max Kramer
 Christian Ferdinand Friedrich Krauss
 Stefan Krauter
 Bernt Krebs
 Herbert Kronke
 Adolph Kussmaul
 Heinrich Lamm
 Rolf Landauer
 Günther Landgraf
 Gerhard Lang
 Dieter Langbein
 Grigori Ivanovitch Langsdorff
 Karl Christian von Langsdorf
 Rüdiger Lautmann
 Gottfried Leibniz
 Walter Liebenthal
 Justus von Liebig
 Rainer Liedtke
 Herbert Lochs
 Adolf Loewy
 Johann von Löwenstern-Kunckel
 Niklas Luhmann
 Hermann Lux
 Michael Maestlin
 Herbert Mataré
 Kurt Mendelssohn
 Friedrich Sigmund Merkel
 Daniel Gottlieb Messerschmidt
 Helmut Metzner
 Viktor Meyer
 Hermann Minkowski
 Achim Müller
 Johannes Peter Müller
 Salomon Müller
 Hermann von Nathusius
 Heinrich Edmund Naumann
 Rudolf Nebel
 Walther Nernst
 Hans E. J. Neugebauer
 Georg von Neumayer
 Bernd Noack
 Hugo Obermaier
 Heinrich Olbers
 Volker Oppitz
 Theodor Peckolt
 Richard Friedrich Johannes Pfeiffer
 Max Planck
 Johannes Plendl
 Kurt Plötner
 Julius Plücker
 Ingo Potrykus
 Ernst Pringsheim Jr.
 Wolfgang Prinz
 Karl Ramsayer
 Samuel Mitja Rapoport
 Eberhard Rees
 Jens Reich
 Ralf Reski
 Berthold Ribbentrop
 Ronald Richter
 Ferdinand von Richthofen
 Nikolaus Riehl
 Bernhard Riemann
 Wilhelm Röntgen
 Walter Rogowski
 Ludwig Roth
 Arthur Rudolph
 Hans Sachs
 Kazem Sadegh-Zadeh
 Karl Ludwig Fridolin von Sandberger
 Monika Schäfer-Korting
 Valentin Scheidel
 Harald Schering
 Claus Schilling
 Johannes Schöner
 Hermann Schlegel
 Gotthilf Heinrich von Schubert
 Ulrich S. Schubert
 Stefan Schuster
 Karl Schwarzschild
 Gerhard Schwehm
 Johann Salomo Christoph Schweigger
 Walter Seelmann-Eggebert
 Johann Andreas Segner
 Meinolf Sellmann
 Friedrich Sellow
 Johann Silberschlag
 Eduard Simon
 Samuel Thomas von Sömmerring
 Frank Steglich
 Matthias Steinmetz
 Karl Stetter
 Erwin Stresemann
 Michael Succow
 Reinhard Süring
 Kurt Tank
 Bernhard Tessmann
 Vera Tiesler
 Gottfried Reinhold Treviranus
 Ida Valeton
 Rudolf Virchow
 Hans Vogel
 Gerhard Vollmer
 Peter Wagner
 Albert H. Walenta
 Otto Heinrich Warburg
 Alfred Wegener
 Friedrich Wegener
 Arthur Wehnelt
 Heinrich Welker
 Guenter Wendt
 Gregor Wentzel
 Richard Wilhelm
 Hans Winkler
 Johannes Winkler
 Friedrich Wöhler
 Nathanael Matthaeus von Wolf
 Theodor Wolf
 Rüdiger Wolfrum
 Johann Zahn
 Karl Ziegler
 Holger Ziegler
 Torsten Zuberbier
 Konrad Zuse
 Eberhard Zwicker

See also 
 Science and technology in Germany
 List of German chemists
 List of German mathematicians
 List of German physicists

German
 
Scientists